The A489, officially known as the Newtown to Machynlleth Trunk Road in Wales, is a trunk road in the United Kingdom running from Craven Arms, Shropshire to Machynlleth, Powys and crossing the Wales-England border.

The road starts about one mile north of Craven Arms. From here it travels through Lydham, Churchstoke, Newtown, Caersws, Cemmaes Road and Machynlleth.

Between Caersws and Cemmaes Road, the road appears to 'disappear', where it is travelling with the A470, which takes priority. The same happens in Lydham, albeit for a much shorter distance, where the A488 takes priority.

A new section of road, the Newtown Bypass, was completed in 2019.

See also
Trunk roads in Wales

References 

Roads in Wales
Transport in Shropshire
Transport in Powys